Metrioglypha confertana is a moth of the family Tortricidae first described by Francis Walker in 1864. It is found in India, Sri Lanka and New Guinea.

References

Moths of Asia
Moths described in 1863